Chris Terkelsen (born 16 February 1972) is a Danish orienteering competitor and World champion. He won a gold medal in the 1997 World Orienteering Championships in Grimstad with the Danish Relay team. He received a silver medal in the 2005 World Orienteering Championships in Aichi (middle distance). He won the overall World Cup in 1998, and received a silver medal in the 2004 European Championships with the Danish relay team.

See also
 Danish orienteers
 List of orienteers
 List of orienteering events

References

External links
 

1972 births
Living people
Danish orienteers
Male orienteers
Foot orienteers
World Orienteering Championships medalists
Junior World Orienteering Championships medalists